Booneville is an unincorporated community in Dallas County, Iowa, United States. It is part of the Des Moines–West Des Moines Metropolitan Statistical Area.

History
Booneville was laid out as a town in 1871. The community is named after the William and Susan Boone family, who were prominent local landowners.

Though once a thriving community, Booneville eventually saw a decline in population with reduced use of the local railroad as well as urban sprawl. The town of Booneville now comprises a restaurant and bar; a Methodist church; the United States Post Office for ZIP code 50038; and a small RV park (part of a mobile home community).

Booneville lies directly northeast of the Raccoon River, and a boat ramp near the town is used frequently.

Although Booneville lies in the annexation path of West Des Moines, situated only a few miles away to the east, West Des Moines officials have stated that there are no plans to annex Booneville in the near future.

References

Unincorporated communities in Dallas County, Iowa
Des Moines metropolitan area
Unincorporated communities in Iowa
1871 establishments in Iowa
Populated places established in 1871